Huntly is a historic town in Aberdeenshire, Scotland.

Huntly may also refer to:

Places
 Huntly, Victoria, Australia
 Shire of Huntly, near Bendigo, Victoria, Australia
 Huntly, New Zealand, a small town south of Auckland 
 Huntly College
 Huntly Power Station, a major coal-fired electricity plant in the same town, often referred to simply as 'Huntly'
 Huntly, Virginia, United States
 Huntly Township, Marshall County, Minnesota, United States

People
 John Huntly (fl. 1882–1883), American politician
 Moira  Huntly (born 1932), British artist and author
 Nancy Huntly, professor of ecology and evolutionary biology
 Huntly Ketchen (1872–1959) Canadian soldier and politician
 Huntly D. Millar (1927–2016), founder and CEO of Millar, Inc

Titles
 Earl of Huntly (1445–1599)
 Marquess of Huntly (created 1599) the oldest existing marquessate in Scotland, held by sometime Chiefs of Clan Gordon

Other
 Huntly Castle
 Huntly F.C.
 Edgar Huntly, a 1799 novel by American author Charles Brockden Brown

See also
Huntley (disambiguation)